When the Road Ends (1992) is a young-adult novel by Jean Thesman.

Plot introduction
Twelve-year-old Mary Jack is in the foster home of a conscientious but clueless Episcopal priest, Father Matt, and his selfish troubled wife Jill. Also in their care is the silent Jane, a seven-year-old girl who had been abused. The house becomes further troubled by the introduction of an Adam, age 14; but when Matt's injured sister comes to live with them, Jill threatens to leave. In order to save his marriage, Matt sends the children and his sister to live in a cabin in the mountains, supposedly with the help of a mean housekeeper who abandons them. They are forced to work together and become a family, with Mary Jack becoming the reluctant "adult" while still trying to reclaim her own childhood.

References

1992 American novels
American young adult novels